U-60 may refer to one of the following German submarines:

 , a Type  submarine launched in 1916 and that served in the First World War until surrendered on 21 November 1918; foundered in English Channel en route to breakers June 1919
 During the First World War, Germany also had these submarines with similar names:
 , a Type UB III submarine launched in 1917 and surrendered on 26 November 1918; foundered in English Channel en route to breakers 12 June 1919
 , a Type UC II submarine launched in 1916 and surrendered on 23 February 1919; broken up at Rainham in 1921
 , a Type IIC submarine that served in the Second World War until scuttled 2 May 1945

Submarines of Germany